Tricholepis is a genus of Asian plants in the tribe Cardueae within the family Asteraceae.

 Species
 Tricholepis amplexicaulis C.B.Clarke - Andhra Pradesh, Telangana, Maharashtra, Orissa, Tamil Nadu, Kerala, Gujarat, Karnataka 
 Tricholepis angustifolia DC. - Kerala, Karnataka, Tamil Nadu 
 Tricholepis chaetolepis (Boiss.) Rech.f. - Afghanistan
 Tricholepis eburnea Rech.f. - Afghanistan
 Tricholepis edmondsonii Rech.f. - Iran
 Tricholepis elongata DC. - Meghalaya, Andhra Pradesh, Telangana, Uttar Pradesh, Himachal Pradesh, Jammu-Kashmir
 Tricholepis furcata DC. - Tibet, Bhutan, Sikkim, Nepal
 Tricholepis glaberrima DC. - Andhra Pradesh, Telangana, Goa, Maharashtra, Tamil Nadu, Gujarat, Karnataka, Madhya Pradesh, Rajasthan 
 Tricholepis karensium Kurz - Yunnan, Andhra Pradesh, Telangana, Laos, Assam, Sri Lanka, Tamil Nadu, Vietnam, Sikkim, Myanmar, Himachal Pradesh, Thailand, Jammu-Kashmir
 Tricholepis montana Dalzell & A.Gibson - Maharashtra, Andhra Pradesh, Telangana, Tamil Nadu
 Tricholepis nakaoi Kitam. - Meghalaya, Jammu-Kashmir, Nagaland 
 Tricholepis radicans (Roxb.) DC. - Himachal Pradesh, Tamil Nadu, Karnataka, Uttar Pradesh, Andhra Pradesh, Telangana, Gujarat, Kerala, Maharashtra 
 Tricholepis roylei Hook.f. - Himachal Pradesh
 Tricholepis stewartei C.B.Clarke ex Hook.f. - Punjab, Jammu-Kashmir
 Tricholepis stictophyllum C.B.Clarke - Uttaranchal, Madhya Pradesh, Myanmar, Uttar Pradesh
 Tricholepis tibetica Hook.f. & Thomson ex C.B.Clarke - Tibet, Afghanistan, Kashmir, Pakistan
 Tricholepis trichocephala Lincz. - Uzbekistan, Altai Krai, Tajikistan, Kyrgyzstan, Afghanistan, Kazakhstan

 formerly included
see Amberboa 
 Tricholepis procumbens - Amberboa ramosa
 Tricholepis raghavendrae - Klasea pallida

References

Cynareae
Asteraceae genera
Taxa named by Augustin Pyramus de Candolle
Taxa described in 1833